Poyans is a commune in the Haute-Saône department in the region of Bourgogne-Franche-Comté in eastern France.

The people are called Poyans and Poyannes, and numbered 146 in 2018. The area is 12.17 km2 and it is located between 194 and 248 metres above sea level.

See also
Communes of the Haute-Saône department

References

Communes of Haute-Saône